Kevin Kim was the defending champion; however, he was eliminated by Takao Suzuki already in the first round.
Chris Guccione defeated Nick Lindahl in the final 6–3, 6–4.

Seeds

Draw

Final four

Top half

Bottom half

References
 Main Draw
 Qualifying Draw

Comerica Bank Challenger - Singles
Nordic Naturals Challenger